Kiowa Tribe v. Manufacturing Technologies, 523 U.S. 751 (1998), was a case in which the Supreme Court of the United States held that an Indian Nation were entitled to sovereign immunity from contract lawsuits, whether made on or off reservation, or involving governmental or commercial activities.

Background
The Kiowa Tribe of Oklahoma entered into an agreement in 1990 to pay $285,000 for stock. The agreement indicates that it was signed on tribal land, but Manufacturing Technologies stated that it was executed in Oklahoma City on non-tribal land. The tribe defaulted and Manufacturing Technologies sued in state court.  The trial court denied the tribe's motion for summary judgment based on tribal sovereignty. The tribe then appealed to the Oklahoma Court of Civil Appeals which affirmed the trial court's decision.  The Oklahoma Supreme Court denied the tribe's request of review.  The U.S. Supreme Court then granted certiorari to hear the case.

Opinion of the Court
Reversed. Justice Anthony Kennedy delivered the opinion of the court.

Justice Kennedy noted that the contract stated that "Nothing in this Note subjects or limits the sovereign rights of the Kiowa Tribe of Oklahoma."  He then noted that unless Congress provides for the abrogation of tribal sovereignty or the tribe waives its immunity, a tribe is not subject to answering a suit in state courts.  The tribe is immune, regardless of whether the matter involves governmental or commercial activities, and regardless of whether the activity occurs on or off of tribal property.

Dissent
Justice John P. Stevens dissented, stating that a state should have the authority to regulate the conduct of tribes that occur off of tribal lands.

Subsequent developments
Subsequent cases have further defined the concept of tribal immunity. C & L Enterprises, Inc. v. Citizen Band Potawatomi Tribe of Okla. noted that while a tribe has immunity, it may waive that immunity by agreeing to an arbitration clause in a contract that the tribe itself provided.

References

External links
 

Kiowa
United States Constitution Article Three case law
United States Supreme Court cases
United States Supreme Court cases of the Rehnquist Court
1998 in United States case law
United States tribal sovereign immunity case law